Lyndsey Scott is an American Supermodel, software developer, and actress. She was the first African American to sign an exclusive runway contract with Calvin Klein and has worked for brands such as Gucci, Prada, and Victoria's Secret. She writes mobile apps for iOS devices.

Early life 

Lyndsey Scott grew up in West Orange, New Jersey, as the eldest of four children. Her father founded a home healthcare company after having been a programmer for the National Security Agency. She practiced martial arts beginning at age nine, and earned a black belt in Taekwondo.

Scott endured bullying while growing up. She reported being the only Black person in her first three years at Newark Academy, her New Jersey preparatory high school, and so thin – "I was maybe 80lb and 5ft 8in." – peers called her a "monster". She stated students would invite, then uninvite her from parties, and tell her she couldn't sit with them in the dining room. "It got so bad in high school I couldn't even look people in the face. I would hide out in school so I wouldn't have to eat lunch in the cafeteria or see people in between classes."

Scott attended Amherst College, where she studied theatre, economics, and physics, before taking computer science. She also ran and did high jump for the Amherst track and field team, earning All-America status for the 400 meter dash. She graduated from Amherst College in 2006 with a joint degree in theatre and computer science.

Modeling 

After college, Scott was more interested in acting than computer science, and began pursuing auditions in New York City. Her body had changed in college, partly due to taking weight-gain supplements, and she says she "started looking more like a model". With the encouragement of friends, she applied for modeling work, but, for two years, was turned down by every agency she approached. Her parents urged her to take computer science jobs.

Scott had, posted her picture on the website Models.com. In 2008, she was contacted by Click Model Management of New York City. Elle Girl then featured her in a video about the day of a fashion model, including some of her Click new model training. At the time, she was 24, which was considered old for a model. The agency asked her to trim five years from her age, and for her first few years modeling, she claimed to have been born in 1990.Even with an agency contract, Scott wasn't immediately successful. In early 2009, she was handing out flyers on a street corner, when she got a call from fashion house Calvin Klein. During New York Fashion Week (NYFW), she became the first Black model to sign an exclusive runway contract with Calvin Klein. Bethann Hardison said that no model in recent history had made such an impact. In 2009, other prestigious modeling jobs followed: Vera Wang, DKNY, Baby Phat, Fendi, Gucci, Louis Vuitton and the 2009 Victoria's Secret Fashion Show. She also appeared in the magazines Italian Elle, Teen Vogue, and W. Style.com listed her as a top 10 newcomer. 

In the 2010 fall NYFW, she was the only Black model walking runways for Prada. She also changed agencies to Elite Model Management, which was more accepting of her actual age.

In December 2013, Scott responded to a question on Quora about "What does it feel like to go from physically unattractive to attractive?" She wrote about being awkward and bullied in high school, getting model looks after college, with the advantages and problems that came with that, while still programming in taped glasses at home. Her answer was reprinted in Slate, Business Insider, and PopSugar.

Until that time, Scott had kept her programming separate from her modeling. The Quora post drew attention to her programming skills. From then on, she was covered as the model with a secret identity as a coder. Others credited her with disproving the stereotypes that fashion models had no brains, and computer programmers were pasty-faced geeks. Fashion magazine Harper's Bazaar combined her passions by asking her to report on the Apple Worldwide Developers Conference. Maria Shriver asked her to detail her favorite mobile apps for NBC News.

Computer programming 
Scott started programming at the age of 12, by writing games for her TI-89 graphing calculator and sharing them with friends in middle school. She learned Java and C++ programming languages and MIPS architecture at Amherst College, and taught herself skills she used for writing applications in Python, Objective C, and iOS. She says that though she enjoyed programming in college, she went into acting and modeling professionally because she never saw herself spending her life around other computer programmers; after graduating, most of her programming was done alone. By 2017, she stated she considered herself "first and foremost" a programmer.

Scott has dedicated herself to educating others about how to program, especially young women. She maintains a profile on Stack Overflow, a website where users gain reputation for providing answers about computer programming. In early 2014, she was one of the top 2% of users with over 2.000 reputation points and more than 38.000 profile views. She was the top ranked user for iOS questions on the site for one month in 2015. As of February 2022, she has over 36,000 reputation points with over 400 answers to user questions and is in the top 1% of users on the platform.

She is the author of multiple iOS programming tutorials on RayWenderlich.com, was a representative for Code.org's second Hour of Code learning initiative, made a video teaching programming with Disney's Frozen characters, and is a mentor at Girls Who Code, an organization teaching programming to teenage girls. She has given talks on programming at schools in Harlem and NYU, and mentored Girl Scouts in programming in Los Angeles.

Her combination of modeling and coding is seen as inspirational to young women: she was named to the Elle "Inspire 100" list in 2014, and the AskMen "Top 99 Outstanding Women 2015" list, which called her "an inspiration for scores of young girls". She was a keynote speaker for the Harvard Undergraduate Women in Business in 2014, and a presenter for the Ford Freedom Awards in 2015.

Applications 

Scott's earliest iOS mobile apps were written on her own, for Standable, Inc., the company she founded in 2011. Scott's first published app was Educate! in support of a non-profit also called Educate!, supporting young Ugandan scholars, and founded by two Amherst students. Her second was iPort, intended to help models organize their career portfolio digitally. Scott says she developed it because it was something she personally needed, as her paper portfolio books were heavy and falling apart. Her third, in 2014, was The Matchmaker, a social network that would alert a user physically near another user compatible in love, friendship, or business. Code Made Cool, released in conjunction with Scott's 2014 appearance on the cover of Asos magazine, was an iPhone app that taught girls programming via drag and drop in fantasy scenarios with animated pictures of Ryan Gosling.

Some of her later apps were written for other companies. She developed beautifulBook for FireBloom Media - it displays classic literature in stylish fonts and backgrounds. The app imDown (written for the company of the same name in 2016), which later became Tall Screen, allowed users to film and share vertical videos of up to a minute in length. Ryse Up is a multimedia application used to connect established and emerging musical artists. It is produced by the company of the same name, for which Scott was a senior engineer for the 1.0 version of the mobile app.

Lyndsey currently works as the lead iOS software engineer at NGO fundraiser Rallybound, where she builds iOS fundraising apps for various non-profit organizations including Susan G. Komen Foundation, AIDS Walk, and Cystic Fibrosis Foundation.

In 2022, she announced the launch of the Lynsey Scott Coding+ Scholarship, which is geared towards LGBTQIA+, women, and/or BIPOC students who are majoring in computer science.

Personal life 
Early in her modeling career, Scott lived on Roosevelt Island, in New York City. By 2017, she lived in Beverly Hills, California.

In 2016, she was sued by a man who leased her Roosevelt Island apartment through Airbnb, and who said that the apartment was dilapidated and the area unsafe; Scott said the posted photos, descriptions and reviews were verifiable and accurate. The case was dismissed.

Scott's father died of leukemia in early 2017.

References

External links 

 Lyndsey Scott official site
 
 Apps by Lyndsey Scott

African-American female models
American female models
African-American models
African-American women engineers
African-American engineers
American women engineers
American computer programmers
Female models from New Jersey
Place of birth missing (living people)
Living people
Newark Academy alumni
People from West Orange, New Jersey
Engineers from New Jersey
21st-century women engineers
Year of birth missing (living people)
African-American computer scientists
American women computer scientists
American computer scientists
21st-century African-American people
21st-century African-American women
Amherst Mammoths athletes